One Heart (2017) is India's first concert film about A. R. Rahman and his music, directed by YM Movies Team. Nazeef Mohammad was the show director of the film, while additional arrangements and music direction was handled by Ranjit Barot respectively.

Cast
 A. R. Rahman - Main Performer/Composer/Main character of the film.
 Ann Marie Calhoun
 Annette Philip
 Ashwin Srinivasan
 Haricharan Seshadri
 Jonita Gandhi
 karthick devaraj 
 Keba Jeremiah
 Mohini Dey
 Sanket Athale
 Shiraz Uppal
 Ranjit Baroot

Critical reception
Sudhir Srinivasan from The New Indian Express said, "As he sings Mahi Ve and sees the love in the eyes of every member of the audience, his eyes almost well up. These little, precious moments, if you care enough to look, add a lot of value to the film." and more he rated it 3/5. Srinivasa Ramanujam from The Hindu said, "For those who've never gone to a concert, One Heart is ideal – it gives you a sense of the atmosphere and sounds. And for those who have, it gives them a chance to undergo a musically-rich experience minus the constant cheering and varied distractions." and more.

References

External links
 One Heart on IMDb
 One Heart on Facebook

2017 films